Alexandre Felske Tadayuki Yokochi (born 13 February 1965) is a Portuguese-born former swimmer. He now resides in the United States and works as a professor of mechanical engineering at Baylor University.

Swimming career
Born in Lisbon, Portugal, Yokochi was a breaststroke swimmer who broke many Portuguese swimming records. One of his most famous achievements was when he broke both the 100 m and 200 m. He competed in many international competitions such as the European Championships and Olympics whilst representing S.L. Benfica. His 100 m and 200 m records remain unbeaten in the Iberian Peninsula. He was trained by his father, Shintaro Yokochi (1935-2023), who was the head coach of S.L. Benfica and as well of the Portugal national team. Yokochi now resides in the United States as a teacher in Baylor University.

Professor career
Yokochi received an M.S. in 1992 from Southern Illinois University Carbondale under the direction of Prof. Conrad C. Hickley and his Ph.D. from Texas A&M University in 1997 under the direction of F. Albert Cotton. After the completion of his degree, he joined the chemistry faculty at Oregon State University where he was a research professor working in the area of chemical crystallography. From 2004-2017 he was a professor in the School of Chemical, Biological, and Environmental Engineering at Oregon State University. Since 2017, he has been with the School of Engineering & Computer Science at Baylor University as a professor in the Mechanical Engineering department.

Yokochi's current research focuses primarily on problems encompassing advanced functional materials and energy problems including the development of nanocomposite materials, the thermochemical production of hydrogen, the storage of renewable energy using flow batteries, and the development of methodology to avoid biofouling on devices deployed in the ocean.

Awards
 European Vice Champion
 Olympics Finalist 7th and 9th and a B Final Champion
 Latin Champion
 World Championship Finalist
 Record Breaker of the Iberian Peninsula
 Olympic Medal Nobre Guedes
 University of Kobe Vice Champion
 Portuguese National Champion
 EEC European Champions Clubs Cup: 1990

References

1965 births
Living people
Swimmers from Lisbon
Portuguese people of German descent
Portuguese people of Japanese descent
Portuguese chemical engineers
European Aquatics Championships medalists in swimming
S.L. Benfica (swimming)
Portuguese male breaststroke swimmers
Oregon State University faculty
Southern Illinois University Carbondale alumni
Texas A&M University alumni
Olympic swimmers of Portugal
Swimmers at the 1984 Summer Olympics
Swimmers at the 1988 Summer Olympics
Swimmers at the 1992 Summer Olympics
Universiade medalists in swimming
Universiade gold medalists for Portugal
Universiade silver medalists for Portugal
Medalists at the 1985 Summer Universiade
Medalists at the 1987 Summer Universiade
American people of Portuguese descent